Alan Doherty (or variants) may refer to:

Alan Doherty, musician in Grada
Allan Doherty, candidate in 1996 Yukon general election
Allen Doherty of Worsley Works
Alan Docherty, candidate for Darlington (UK Parliament constituency)